The IEEE Control Systems Award is a technical field award given to an individual by the Institute of Electrical and Electronics Engineers (IEEE) "for outstanding contributions to control systems engineering, science or technology". It is an IEEE-level award, created in 1980 by the board of directors of the IEEE, but sponsored by the IEEE Control Systems Society.

Originally the name was IEEE Control Systems Science and Engineering Award, but after 1991 the IEEE changed it to IEEE Control Systems Award.

Recipients of this award receive a bronze medal, a certificate, and an honorarium.

Recipients
The following people received the IEEE Control Systems Science and Engineering Award:

 1982: Howard H. Rosenbrock
 1983: No award
 1984: Arthur E. Bryson, Jr.
 1985: George Zames
 1986: Charles A. Desoer
 1987: Walter Murray Wonham
 1988: Dante C. Youla
 1989: Yu-Chi Ho
 1990: Karl Johan Åström
 1991: Roger W. Brockett

The following people received the IEEE Control Systems Award:
 
 1992: Harold J. Kushner
 1993: Moshe M. Zakai
 1994: Elmer G. Gilbert
 1995: Petar V. Kokotovic
 1996: Vladimir A. Yakubovich
 1997: Brian D. O. Anderson
 1998: Jan C. Willems
 1999: A. Stephen Morse
 2000: Sanjoy K. Mitter
 2001: Keith Glover
 2002: Pravin Varaiya
 2003: N. N. Krasovski
 2004: John C. Doyle
 2005: Manfred Morari
 2006: P. R. Kumar
 2007: Lennart Ljung
 2008: Mathukumalli Vidyasagar
 2009: David Q. Mayne
 2010: Graham Clifford Goodwin
 2011: Eduardo D. Sontag
 2012: Alberto Isidori
 2013: Stephen P. Boyd
 2014: Tamer Başar
 2015: Bruce Francis
 2016: Arthur J. Krener
 2017: Richard M. Murray
 2018: John N. Tsitsiklis 
 2019: Pramod Khargonekar
 2020: Anders Lindquist
 2021: Hidenori Kimura
 2022: Dimitri Bertsekas

See also

 List of people in systems and control
 List of engineering awards
 Giorgio Quazza Medal
 Hendrik W. Bode Lecture Prize
 Richard E. Bellman Control Heritage Award
 Rufus Oldenburger Medal

References 

Control Systems Award